Zhu Xiaogang(Chinese: 朱晓刚; Pinyin: Zhū Xiǎogāng; born 6 October 1987) is a Chinese footballer who currently plays for Guangxi Yong City.

Club career
Zhu started his professional career with Chinese Super League side Dalian Shide in 2007. However, he failed to establish himself within the first team and could not appear for the club in the 2007 season. In January 2008, after an unsuccessful trial at Wuhan Optics Valley, Zhu transferred to another Super League club Chengdu Blades along with his teammates Ji Mingyi and Zou Peng for a total fee of ¥5 million. Zhu was excluded from Chengdu's first team squad in the 2009 league season.

Zhu was signed by China League Two side Dalian Aerbin (now known as Dalian Professional) in 2010. He became a regular player of the club, helping Dalian Aerbin win two successive championships as the team won promotion into Chinese Super League.

Since the 2019 season, Zhu was put on the bench as the team focused on using young players. He was excluded from the first team squad in the 2020 and 2021 season. On 27 January 2021, he sought for a transfer to top tier club Qingdao F.C.. On 19 February 2021, after training with Qingdao the signing was eventually aborted.

On 18 March 2022, he joined fourth tier club Guangxi Yong City as player and assistant coach.

International career
Zhu played for China PR national beach soccer team between 2007 and 2008.

Career statistics
Statistics accurate as of match played 31 December 2022.

Honours

Club
Dalian Yifang/ Dalian Professional
 China League One: 2011, 2017.
 China League Two: 2010

References

External links
 

1987 births
Living people
Chinese footballers
Footballers from Dalian
Association football midfielders
Dalian Shide F.C. players
Chengdu Tiancheng F.C. players
Dalian Professional F.C. players
Chinese Super League players
China League One players